George Albert Evans (26 July 1935 – December 2000) was a Welsh footballer, who played as a wing half for Wrexham and Chester in the 1950s and 1960s.

Playing career
Evans spent time as a youngster with Bolton Wanderers and Blackpool before playing non-league football for Oswestry Town. He later joined Wrexham as a part-time player, continuing to work at Bersham Colliery near Wrexham.

In October 1957 he made his debut in The Football League for Wrexham against Hartlepools United, going on to make 175 league appearances for the club until 1963. That summer saw Evans move to Chester along with Stan Bennion in exchange for Bill Myerscough, where he again more than 100 league appearances.

After leaving Chester in 1969, Evans played for Bethesda Athletic and Colwyn Bay while continuing to work for the National Coal Board.

Honours
Wrexham
Football League Fourth Division promotion: 1961–62 (third place)
Welsh Cup winners: 1958; runners-up: 1962

Chester
 Welsh Cup runners-up: 1966

References

1935 births
2000 deaths
Welsh footballers
English Football League players
Association football midfielders
Oswestry Town F.C. players
Wrexham A.F.C. players
Chester City F.C. players
Bethesda Athletic F.C. players
Colwyn Bay F.C. players